Dieter Hoffmann (27 August 1941 – 16 September 2016) was a German former athlete who competed in the 1964 Summer Olympics and in the 1968 Summer Olympics. He was born in Danzig and died in Luckenwalde.

References

1941 births
2016 deaths
German male shot putters
Olympic athletes of the United Team of Germany
Olympic athletes of East Germany
Athletes (track and field) at the 1964 Summer Olympics
Athletes (track and field) at the 1968 Summer Olympics
Sportspeople from Gdańsk
European Athletics Championships medalists
People from West Prussia